Pushpanjali (An Offering of Flowers) is a 1970 Hindi, romantic drama film, produced and directed by Kishore Sahu. The film was made under the "Kishore Sahu Productions" banner. The story, screenplay and dialogues were by Kishore Sahu. Laxmikant Pyarelal composed the music for the film, with lyrics written by Anand Bakshi. Sanjay Khan, Naina Sahu, Kishore Sahu, Premnath, Faryal, Manmohan Krishan, Lalita Pawar and Om Prakash were the main star cast of the film.

Mukesh sang a notable song in the film, "Jaane Chale Jaate Hain Kahan". The music of the film was composed by Laxmikant Pyarelal.

Having recently lost his wife, Dinesh Khanna (Sanjay Khan) takes his ailing son to an island. Here, they come across a variety of people who all seem to be after the rich Rani Sahiba's diamond necklace. The film ends with a miraculous recovery for Dinesh's son.

Plot
Dinesh Khanna (Sanjay Khan), discovers his son has brain cancer. The shock kills his wife, Lata (Faryal). Dinesh takes his son, Pappu (Shahid), and his faithful cook Maharaj (Manmohan Krishan) to an island, where they meet several characters who are after Rani Sahiba's (Lalita Pawar) diamond necklace. Dinesh and Pappu also get to know Menaka (Naina Sahu), who starts caring for Pappu. When Pappu has a seizure, a doctor is flown down to the island with the help of one of the kind-hearted crooked characters (Om Prakash). The doctor suggests an operation, but cannot give surety of Pappu surviving the ordeal. A dis-heartened Dinesh refuses the operation for Pappu and takes him to a temple. Pappu recovers miraculously and offers flowers (pushpanjali) at the idol of Shiva as a thanksgiving. Dinesh leaves the island with Pappu and Menaka.

Cast
 Sanjay Khan as Dinesh Khanna
 Naina Sahu as Menaka Sharma
 Kishore Sahu as Jamal Pasha
 Faryal as Lata Khanna
 Premnath as Peter D'Costa
 Om Prakash
 Lalita Pawar as Rani Sahiba
 Manmohan Krishan as Maharaj, the cook
 Master Shahid as Pappu
 Nazir Kashmiri
 Jankidas as tour guide
 Shabnam as Lily 
 Lolita Chatterjee
 Brahm Bhardwaj as Dr. Sharma
 Mridula Rani as Mrs. Sharma
 Asrani

Crew
 Producer: Kishore Sahu
 Director: Kishore Sahu
 Associate Director: Rohit Sahu
 Associate producers: Preeti Sahu
 Cinematography: K. H. Kapadia
 Editing: Kantilal B. Shukla
 Art Direction and set decoration: Sant Singh
 Make-up: Mamta Sahu, Prem Kumar
 Special Effects: Parduman
 Music: Laxmikant Pyarelal
 Lyrics: Anand Bakshi
 Song Recordist: Minoo Katrak, D. O. Bhansali
 Choreographer: P. L. Raj

Location
According to the credit roll, the film is set in Kerala. The temples used for the temple sequences are Shri Ekambareswarar Temple, and the Shri Varadaraja Swami Temple, Kanchipuram, Tamil Nadu.

Soundtrack
Composers Laxmikant Pyarelal had Mukesh playback singing a notable song in the film, "Jaane Chale Jaate Hain Kahan" and Manna Dey giving playback for "Sham Dhale Jamuna Kinare".  The lyricist was Anand Bakshi and the other singers were Lata Mangeshkar and Asha Bhosle.

Songs

References

External links

1970 films
1970s Hindi-language films
Films directed by Kishore Sahu
Films scored by Laxmikant–Pyarelal